The men's marathon event at the 2020 Summer Olympics started at 07:00 on 8 August 2021 in Sapporo, Japan. 106 athletes from 46 nations competed. The previous Olympic champion, Kenyan Eliud Kipchoge, successfully defended his title, with Dutch and Belgian athletes Abdi Nageeye and Bashir Abdi gaining silver and bronze, respectively. Kipchoge was the third man to repeat as Olympic marathon champion, after Abebe Bikila and Waldemar Cierpinski. The Netherlands and Belgium earned their first men's marathon medals since 1980 and 1976, respectively.

The race was moved north, from Tokyo to Sapporo because the latter is on average  cooler in August, as decided in 2019 by the IOC. Sapporo recorded  at 07:00 when the race started, not much different from Tokyo The gifts were presented by David Katz, United States; World Athletics Competition Commission Member.

Summary
Before the start of the race, four athletes were introduced and took their positions on the start line, host nation Japanese champion Suguru Osako, Rio bronze medalist Galen Rupp, 2019 World Champion Lelisa Desisa and Rio gold medalist, world record holder Eliud Kipchoge, honored with the applause of his competitors. 102 others then toed the line with them. While some fell off the back from the start, the lead group filled the width of the street. About two kilometres into the race, the first leader, Jeison Suárez, began to assert himself. Suárez stayed on the front for the next 22 kilometres, joined by a succession of other frontrunners; Yang Shaohui, Amanal Petros, Mohamed Reda El Aaraby, Stephen Mokoka and Daniel Ferreira do Nascimento all under the watchful eye of Kipchoge, his Kenyan teammates Lawrence Cherono and Amos Kipruto, Desisa and Rupp. 

A pack of over fifty at 5,000 metres dwindled to about twenty by the half way mark as other notable runners fell off the back, with many dropping out. Going in to the 25,000 meter mark, Kipchoge upped the pace. The pack became a string of runners trying to chase, led by the Kenyans and Rupp. At 28,000 metres Kipchoge attempted a break but was caught shortly after. Just after the 30,000 meter mark, he attempted another break, this time staying well ahead of the other competitors, eventually building a 27 second lead over the chase pack that had dwindled to Cherono, Ayad Lamdassem and Bashir Abdi with Abdi Nageeye hanging on a few seconds later. With Cherono at the point over the next 5,000 metres, the remaining foursome congealed into a pack, each trying to figure a tactic to take silver as Kipchoge pulled away into the distance. Coming from 30 seconds back of the group, Osako was rapidly making up ground. With 1,000 metres to go, Cherono tried to make a break, but Nageeye held onto his back. Cherono tried to break again, this time Lamdassem was dropped. Approaching the finish line Nageeye, sensing Cherono was spent, accelerated and waved to Abdi to follow him. Abdi responded, with Nageeye getting silver and Abdi bronze two seconds up on Cherono. Kipchoge won by 1:20, greater than his Rio margin of victory.

Very tough weather conditions forced many runners to retire. These included the 2012 champion Stephen Kiprotich and all three Ethiopian runners, among them the current World champion Lelisa Desisa. Only 76 out of 106 athletes finished. The last one was Iván Zarco from Honduras, who was essentially running alone for the whole race and finished 36 minutes behind the winner. Most of the race participants, including Nageeye and Bashir, finished with the season best results, which mainly reflected the lack of competitions due to the COVID-19 limitations.

Kipchoge became the third man to successfully defend the Olympic Marathon title, after Abebe Bikila and Waldemar Cierpinski.

Background
This was the 29th appearance of the event, which is one of 12 athletics events to have been held at every Summer Olympics. Five of the top 10 runners from Rio 2016 returned: gold medalist Eliud Kipchoge of Kenya, bronze medalist Galen Rupp of the United States, fifth-place finisher Alphonce Simbu of Tanzania, seventh-place finisher Tadesse Abraham of Switzerland, and ninth-place finisher Callum Hawkins of Great Britain.

No nations made their men's marathon debut in Tokyo. The United States made its 28th appearance, most of any nation, having missed only the boycotted 1980 Games.

Qualification

Approximately 80 athletes were initially expected to compete (target number of 80) by entry time or ranking; the final number was 110 runners qualified by time, with NOCs universality places yet to enter athletes in addition to the 110 qualifying through time, much more than the expected due to the postponed Games (4 universality places were used in 2016). The qualification period for the entry standard (2:11:30) was from 1 January 2019 to 31 May 2021, with a maximum quota of 3 athletes per National Olympic Committee. Performances achieved between 6 April 2020 and 30 November 2020 were not considered in the qualification system.

A National Olympic Committee (NOC) could enter up to 3 qualified athletes in the men's marathon if all athletes meet the entry standard or qualify by ranking during the qualifying period. (The limit of 3 has been in place since the 1930 Olympic Congress.) The qualifying standard is 2:11:30. This standard was "set for the sole purpose of qualifying athletes with exceptional performances unable to qualify through the IAAF World Rankings pathway." Runners in the top 10 at the 2019 world championship, the top 5 at any IAAF Gold Label marathon, and the top 10 at the Marathon Major Series were deemed to have met the qualifying standard, regardless of actual time. The world rankings, based on the average of the best five results for the athlete over the qualifying period and weighted by the importance of the meet, will then be used to qualify athletes until the cap of 80 is reached. More than 80 athletes (after application of the 3 per NOC rule) have met the qualifying standard.

To be a qualifying performance, the course had to have been certified in the last five years by a Grade A or Grade B road course measurer. In order to be eligible for the qualifying standard time, the elevation decrease could not be more than 1 metre per kilometre. For world rankings, the elevation decrease could exceed that rate, but a correction would be made to the score.

The qualifying period was originally from 1 January 2019 to 31 May 2020. Due to the COVID-19 pandemic, the period was suspended from 6 April 2020 to 30 November 2020, with the end date extended to 31 May 2021. The world rankings period start date was also changed from 1 January 2019 to 1 December 2018. The qualifying time standards could be obtained in various meets during the given period that have the approval of the IAAF. The most recent Area Championships may be counted in the ranking, even if not during the qualifying period. In July 2020, World Athletics announced that the suspension period would be lifted for the road events (marathons and race walks) on 1 September 2020.

NOCs can also use their universality place—each NOC can enter one male athlete regardless of time if they had no male athletes meeting the entry standard for an athletics event—in the marathon.

Qualification ended on 31 May 2021. Both marathons had a target number of 80 athletes, but a larger number of athletes have fulfilled the qualifying criteria and will compete in Sapporo, the venue of the Olympic road events. In the men's field, 106 athletes have qualified (with a maximum of 3 per nation).

Competition format and course
As all Olympic marathons, the competition was a single race. The marathon distance of 42.195 km was run over a course that starts with two laps around Odori Park. The route then includes a large loop (about half the marathon's length) through the streets of Sapporo, passing by Nakajima Park, Sapporo TV Tower, and Hokkaido University, and crossing the Toyohira River twice. The course then takes two trips around a smaller (approximately 10 kilometres) section of the large loop. The finish line is back at Odori Park.

Records
Prior to this competition, the existing world, Olympic, and area records were as follows.

* — Boston Marathon, aided road course per IAAF rule 260.28

No new records were established during the competition.

Schedule
All times are Japan Standard Time (UTC+9)

The men's marathon took place on a single day.

Results

References

Men's marathon
Marathons at the Olympics
Summer Olympics
Men's marathons
Men's events at the 2020 Summer Olympics